The Villain is a 2018 Indian action thriller film written and directed by Prem and produced by C. R. Manohar. It stars Shiva Rajkumar, Sudeepa and Amy Jackson, while Saranya Ponvannan, Srikanth and Mithun Chakraborty play supporting roles. The score and soundtrack of the film were composed by Arjun Janya. The film was released on 18 October 2018.

Plot
The Villain revolves around Ramu, who is searching for someone where his mother's chain gets stolen by a chain-snatcher, who drops it somewhere during the chase. He meets a social activist Seetha, who is saved by Ramu when unknown goons arrive to kill her and finds his chain, but Seetha reveals it is her chain. When Ramu ask Seetha about the chain, she reveals about Kaizer-Ram, who is a crime boss in Dubai and she meets him in a drama, when he was travelling to Sri Lanka. Kaizer-Ram falls in love with Seetha and meet at a temple where he reveals that Kaizer and Ram are different persons and Kaizer is actually his best friend. 

Later, Unknown assassins arrive to kill Ram, where one of them reveals that Kaizer intends to kill Ram to make the Police department believe that Kaizer-Ram is dead. Seetha reveals that though she has fallen for Ram, she reveals herself as ACP Brahmavar's daughter, who wants to capture Ram to restore Brahmavar's honour. Dejected and betrayed, Ram surrenders to the police and later escapes and ask Seetha to arrive at a highway where he is caught by Kaizer and leave in a car. Ram throws the chain and pendrive before getting into the car. The car explodes killing Ram and Kaizer. In the present, Ramu is taken to meet Kaizer where he reveals to Ramu that Ram escaped from the explosion and has now known as Raavana in UK's crime syndicate. 

At UK, Ram kills UK's underworld boss Thomas, with his friend Alex's help. Ramu leaves for UK and kidnaps Alex from the police convoy where he calls Ram and they challenge one another and a cat-mouse game ensues where Alex is killed, before Ramu tortures him to reveal about Ram. Ram comes across Seetha, who is now a call girl, but is later revealed that she was sent by Ram. Later, Ramu reveals to Seetha that he is an orphan and meets Vishalavva, who is Ram's mother. Vishalavva reveals that Ram went missing when she and her husband Vishwanna had a fallout, who later dies due to heart stroke. Vishalavva request Ramu to find Ram. 

Ramu, who considers Vishalavva as her mother promises her that he will find Rama. Ram learns Ramu's identity and decide to confront him in Bangalore, but the minister, who supported Ram double-crosses him. Ramu returns to Bangalore and leaves for his village but Kaizer, having learnt of Ramu's agenda sends his henchman to attack him. Ram saves Ramu, who double-crossed the minister by briving his bodyguards and had arrived in Bangalore. Kaizer later dies due to a stroke, by seeing Ram. Ram and Ramu defeat the goons where Ramu reveals that his mother Vishalavva is alive and has been waiting to see him. 

Ram refuses as Vishalavva expected him to be upright like Lord Rama, but has become Raavana and request Ram to tell Vishalavva that he died but before leaving, Ramu ask Rama to show Vishalavva at least once. Ramu meets Vishalavva, who doesn't believe that Ram is dead. Ram, overcome by emotion meets Vishalavva and reunites with her, much to Ramu and Seetha's happiness.

Cast
 Shiva Rajkumar as Ramu
 Sudeepa as Rama (Kaizer-Ram) aka Raavana
 Meka Srikanth as Kaizer
 Amy Jackson as Seetha (Voice by Rakshitha)
 Mithun Chakraborty as ACP Brahmavar (cameo appearance)
 Tilak Shekar as Alex
 Saranya Ponvannan as Vishalavva, Ram's mother
 Sharath Lohitashwa as Vishwanna Ram's father
 Prathap as Kowde Shastri, Ramu's friend
 Mandya Ramesh as Ramu's friend
 Rachita Ram as herself in the song "Bolo Bolo Ramappa"
 Shash as a Spy
 Shanvi Srivastava as herself in the song "Bolo Bolo Ramappa"
 Radhika Narayan as herself in the song "Bolo Bolo Ramappa"
 Samyukta Hornad as herself in the song "Bolo Bolo Ramappa"
 Shraddha Srinath as herself in the song "Bolo Bolo Ramappa"
 Bhavana Rao as herself in the song "Bolo Bolo Ramappa"

Production

Director Prem announced new film starring Shivaraj Rajkumar and Kichcha Sudeepa. The film is about a villager who dreams to become an actor. The film is produced by C. R. Manohar and they signed Bollywood actor Mithun Chakraborty in an important role that has been kept as a secret in the beginning, but the news was later leaked to the press. The film was launched by then Karnataka's Chief Minister Siddaramaiah on 13 December 2015 and the first look was released in March 2017. Before the release of the first look, the movie was titled as Kali taglined Ruler Warrior. But later was changed as The Villain taglined Ram Ravan due to some reasons. The film completed a schedule and was reported to have portions in England and two other foreign countries to be shot. By then, the film fetched 5.4 crore as Hindi rights. Actress Amy Jackson was signed as the female lead. The song "Jeeva Hoovagide" from Nee Nanna Gellalare composed by Ilaiyaraaja was shot with Shiva Rajkumar and Amy Jackson in replicated costumes of Rajkumar and Manjula from the original film in a schedule where entire talkie portions were shot, except few songs. Later, filming the climax was completed on 1 February as per actor Sudeepa's tweet.

Music

Arjun Janya was signed to compose music and background score for the movie.

Release

Theatrical
The Villain was wide released on 18 October 2018.

Reception

Box office
The film opened on a very high note and collected exactly 20 crore on day 1 .But couldn't maintain the same momentum and collections fell for 85% on day 2 and 91% on day 3 and the first weekend collection was reported to be around 60 crores .

References

External links
 

2010s Kannada-language films
Indian action thriller films
Films scored by Arjun Janya
Fiction about body swapping
Body swapping in films
2018 action thriller films
2018 films
Films shot in Thailand
Films shot in Bangalore
Films directed by Prem